Sala, Lampang is a village and tambon (subdistrict) of Ko Kha District, in Lampang Province, Thailand. In 2005 it had a total population of 8732 people. The tambon contains  7 villages.

Gallery

References

Tambon of Lampang province
Populated places in Lampang province